Michael Madhusudan Dutt ((Bengali: মাইকেল মধুসূদন দত্ত); (25 January 1824 – 29 June 1873) was a Bengali poet and playwright. He is considered one of the pioneers of Bengali literature.

Early life
Dutt was born in Sagardari, a village in Keshabpur Upazila, Jessore District of Bengal, to a Hindu family. His family being reasonably well-off, Dutt received an education in the English language and additional tutorship in English at home. Rajnarayan had intended for this Western education to open the doors for a government position for his son.

College and religious conversion
After he finished his education in Sagordari at roughly the age of fifteen, Rajnarayan sent Madhusudhan to Calcutta to attend Hindu College with the eventual aim of becoming a barrister. At Hindu College, Michael studied under a westernized curriculum in a university which had been expressly founded for the "uplift of the natives". The university stipulated that all students had to dress in Western clothing, eat European cuisine using cutlery, learn British songs and speak only English with the aim of creating an anglicized middle class of Indians which would serve as officials in the colonial administration. During his time at Hindu College, Madhusudhan developed an aversion to Indian culture and a deep yearning to become accepted into European culture. He expressed these sentiments in one of his poems:

"Where man in all his truest glory lives,
And nature's face is exquisitely sweet;
For those fair climes I heave impatient sigh,
There let me live and there let me die".

An early and formative influence on Dutta was his teacher at Hindu College, David Lester Richardson. Richardson was a poet and inspired in Dutta a love of English poetry, particularly Byron. Dutta began writing English poetry aged around 17 years, sending his works to publications in England, including Blackwood's Magazine and Bentley's Miscellany. They were, however, never accepted for publication. This was also the time when he began a correspondence with his friend, Gour Das Bysack, which today forms the bulk of sources on his life.

Madhusudan embraced Christianity at the Old Mission Church, in spite of the objections of his parents and relatives, on 9 February 1843. He did not take the name Michael until his marriage in 1848.

He describes the day as:
Long sunk in superstition's night,
By Sin and Satan driven,
I saw not, cared not for the light
That leads the blind to Heaven.
But now, at length thy grace, O Lord!
Birds all around me shine;
I drink thy sweet, thy precious word,
I kneel before thy shrine!

He had to leave Hindu College on account of being a convert. In 1844, he resumed his education at Bishop's College, where he stayed for three years.

In 1847, he moved to Madras (Chennai) due to family tensions and economic hardship, having been disinherited by his father. While in Madras, he stayed in the Black Town neighbourhood, and began working as an "usher" at the Madras Male Orphan Asylum. Four years later, in 1851, he became a Second Tutor in the Madras University High School. He edited and assisted in editing the periodicals Madras Circulator and General Chronicle, Athenaeum, Spectator and Hindoo Chronicle.

Literary life

Early works (1849–1855) 
Dutta wrote exclusively in English in his early writing years. The Captive Ladie was published in 1849 and, like Derozio's The Fakeer of Jungheera,  takes on the form of a long narrative poem. In The Anglo-Saxon and the Hindu (1854), an essay in florid, even purple, prose, are references to and quotations from almost the whole of Macaulay's shelf of European books. He was greatly influenced by the works of William Wordsworth and John Milton. Dutta was a spirited bohemian and Romantic.

Calcutta Years (1858–1862) 
The period during which he worked as a head clerk and later as the Chief Interpreter in the court marked his transition to writing in his native Bengali, following the advice of Bethune and Bysack. He wrote 5 plays: Sermista (1859), Padmavati (1859), Ekei Ki Boley Sabyata (1860), Krishna Kumari (1860) and Buro Shaliker Ghare Ron (1860). Then followed the narrative poems: Tilottama Sambhava Kavya (1861), Meghnad Badh Kavya (1861), Brajagana Kavya (1861) and Veerangana Kavya (1861). He also translated three plays from Bangla to English, including his own Sermista.

Final years (1866–1873) 
A volume of his Bangla sonnets was published in 1866. His final play, Maya Kannan, was written in 1872. The Slaying of Hector, his prose version of the Iliad remains incomplete.

Linguistic abilities 
Madhusudan was a gifted linguist and polyglot. He studied English, Bengali, Hebrew, Latin, Greek, Tamil, Telugu, and Sanskrit.

Work with the sonnet
Michael Madhusudan Dutt dedicated his first sonnet to his friend Rajnarayan Basu, which he accompanied with a letter: "What say you to this, my good friend? In my humble opinion, if cultivated by men of genius, our sonnet in time would rival the Italian." His most famous sonnet is Kapatakkha River.
Always, o river, you peep in my mind.
Always I think you in this loneliness.
Always I soothe my ears with the murmur
Of your waters in illusion, the way
Men hear songs of illusion in a dream.
Many a river I have seen on earth;
But which can quench my thirst the way you do?
You're the flow of milk in my homeland's breasts.
Will I meet you ever? As long as you
Go to kinglike ocean to pay the tax
Of water, I beg to you, sing my name
Into the ears of people of Bengal,
Sing his name, o dear, who in this far land
Sings your name in all his songs for Bengal.

When Dutta later stayed in Versailles, the sixth centenary of the Italian poet Dante Alighieri was being celebrated all over Europe. He composed a poem in honour of the poet, translated it into French and Italian, and sent it to the king of Italy. Victor Emmanuel II, then monarch, liked the poem and wrote to Dutt, saying, "It will be a ring which will connect the Orient with the Occident."

Work in blank verse
Sharmistha (spelt as Sermista in English) was Dutt's first attempt at blank verse in Bengali literature. Kaliprasanna Singha organised a felicitation ceremony to Madhusudan to mark the introduction of blank verse in Bengali poetry. His famous epic, quoted as the only epic of Bengali-kind, Meghnadbad-Kabya is also totally written in blank verse.

Praising Dutt's blank verse, Sir Ashutosh Mukherjee, observed: "As long as the Bengali race and Bengali literature would exist, the sweet lyre of Madhusudan would never cease playing." He added: "Ordinarily, reading of poetry causes a soporific effect, but the intoxicating vigour of Madhusudan's poems makes even a sick man sit up on his bed."

In his The Autobiography of an Unknown Indian, Nirad C. Chaudhuri has remarked that during his childhood days in Kishoreganj, a common standard for testing guests' erudition in the Bengali language during family gatherings was to require them to recite the poetry of Dutt, without an accent.

Barrister-at-Law 

Dutta went to England in 1862 to become a Barrister-at-Law, and enrolled at the Gray's Inn.

On the eve of his departure to England:Forget me not, O Mother,
Should I fail to return
To thy hallowed bosom.
Make not the lotus of thy memory
Void of its nectar honey.
(Translated from the original Bengali by the poet.)

His family joined him in 1863, and thereafter they shifted to the much cheaper Versailles, due to the miserable state of their finances. Funds were not arriving from India according to his plans. He was only able to relocate to England in 1865 and study for the bar due to the munificent generosity of Ishwar Chandra Vidyasagar. For this, Dutta was to regard Vidyasagar as Dayar Sagar (meaning the ocean of kindness) for as long as he lived. He was admitted to the High Court in Calcutta on his return in February 1867. His family followed him in 1869.

His stay in England had left him disillusioned with European culture. He wrote to his friend Bysack from France:

Marriage and family
Dutta had refused to enter into an arranged marriage which his father had decided for him. He had no respect for that tradition and wanted to break free from the confines of caste-based endogamous marriage. His knowledge of the European tradition convinced him of his choice of marriages made by mutual consent (or love marriages).

He was the first Bengali to marry a European or Anglo-Indian woman. While in Madras he married Indo-Scottish-Britton, Rebecca Thompson McTavish, a 17-year-old resident of the Madras Female Orphan Asylum, on 31 July 1848. Dutta assumed the name Michael when the marriage was registered in the baptismal register. They had four children together. He wrote to Bysack in December 1855:

Dutta returned from Madras to Calcutta in February 1856, after his father's death (in 1855), abandoning his wife and four children in Madras. No records of his divorce from Rebecca or remarriage have been found. In 1858, he was joined there by a 22-year old of French extraction, Emelia Henrietta Sophie White, the daughter of his colleague at the Madras Male Orphan Asylum. They had two sons, Frederick Michael Milton (23 July 1861 – 11 June 1875) and Albert Napoleon (1869 – 22 August 1909), and a daughter, Henrietta Elizabeth Sermista (1859 – 15 February 1879). A fourth child was stillborn. Their relationship lasted until the end of his life, Henrietta pre-deceasing him by three days, on 26 June 1873.

Rebecca died in Madras in July 1892. Only a daughter and a son survived her. The son, McTavish-Dutt, practised as a pleader in the Court of Small Causes in Madras.

The tennis player Leander Paes is a direct descendant of Dutt, who is his great-great-grandson on his mother's side.

Death
Dutta died in Calcutta General Hospital on 29 June 1873. Three days prior to his death, he recited a passage from Shakespeare's Macbeth to his dear friend Bysack, to express his deepest conviction of life:
...out, out, brief candle!
Life's but a walking shadow; a poor player,
That struts and frets his hour upon the stage,
And then is heard no more; it is a tale Told by an idiot,
full of sound and fury, Signifying nothing.

Legacy and honours
Dutta was largely ignored for 15 years after his death. The belated tribute was a tomb erected at his gravesite.

His epitaph, a verse of his own, reads:
Stop a while, traveller!
Should Mother Bengal claim thee for her son.
As a child takes repose on his mother's elysian lap,
Even so here in the Long Home,
On the bosom of the earth,
Enjoys the sweet eternal sleep
Poet Madhusudan of the Duttas.

Michael Madhusudhan is a 1950 Indian Bengali-language drama film by Modhu Bose which starred Utpal Dutt in the titular role.

Author Namita Gokhale published a play about Madhusudhan in 2021, based largely on letters written by him to friends and other authors, called Betrayed by Hope.

In honour of Dutt, every year on his birthday a fair is held in his home at Sagardari. Which is organized by District Council of Jessore . Every year various MP and Minister of national parliament of Bangladesh attend this fair.

In honour of Dutt a school and a college are named after him in Jessore District. And a university was proposed to be set up in this birth place. They are;

 Michael Madhusudan College
 Sagardari Michael Madhusudan Institution
 Micheal Madhusudan Specialized University

In India 

 Michael Madhusudan Dutta College in Tripura name after him.

Works
 King Porus
 The Captive Ladie (1849)
 Ratul Potra
 Sermista (1859) (Bengali and English)
 Padmavati (1859)
 Ekei Ki Boley Sabyota (1860)
 Krishna Kumari (1860)
 Buro Shaliker Ghare Ron (1860)
 Tilottama Sambhava Kavya (1861)
 Meghnad Badh Kavya (1861)
 Brajagana Kavya (1861)
 Veerangana Kavya (1861)
 Ratnavali (English translation)
 Nil Darpan (English translation)
 Choturdoshpodi Kobitaboli
 Rizia, the Sultana of Inde
 Rosalo Sornolatika
 Bongobani
 Sonnets and other poems (1866)
  Bongo bhumir prati

See also

 Indian poetry in English
 Indian English literature
 Indian literature

References

Further reading
  – Gopa Majumdar's translation of Ashar Chalane Bhuli
 
 Modhusudoner Engreji Kabita by Sayeed Abubakar, Bhumika Prakashani, Bangla Bazar, Dhaka-1100, (2009)

External links

   
 Hindu School, Kolkata – Web Site
 Tilottoma Sambhaba Kabya
 

Bengali male poets
Bengali-language poets
Bengali writers
Writers from Kolkata
Poets from West Bengal
Bengali-language writers
Presidency University, Kolkata alumni
Converts to Christianity
Converts to Christianity from Hinduism
Indian male poets
English-language poets from India
1824 births
1873 deaths
Sonneteers
People from Jessore District
19th-century Indian poets
19th-century Indian male writers
Indian Christian writers